William Troy (1848 – March 8, 1907) entered service in the US Navy from Massachusetts as a United States Navy sailor. For bravery in action during the 1871 Korean Expedition he received the Medal of Honor on June 11, 1871. He was part of the party that rescued the mortally wounded Hugh McKee at Citadel Korea and was himself wounded and specifically commended by the Lieutenant.

Originally buried at the Stockton State Hospital Cemetery, his remains were moved to the San Joaquin Valley National Cemetery (Section M-1, Grave 53) in Santa Nella Village, Merced County, California.

Medal of Honor citation
Rank and organization: Ordinary Seaman, U.S. Navy. Born: 1848, Boston, Mass. Accredited to: Massachusetts. G.O. No.: 169, February 8, 1872.
On board the U.S.S. Colorado during the capture of the Korean forts, 11 June 1871. Fighting at the side of Lt. McKee, by whom he was especially commended, Troy was badly wounded by the enemy.

See also

 List of Medal of Honor recipients

References

United States Navy Medal of Honor recipients
People from Boston
United States Navy sailors
1848 births
1907 deaths
Korean Expedition (1871) recipients of the Medal of Honor